Martin de Thurah (born 29 April 1974 in Copenhagen) is a Danish film director, screenwriter, cinematographer and music video director.

De Thurah graduated from National Film School of Denmark in 2002.

Awards

 The music video for Carpark North's "Human" won DMA ("Danish Grammy") for Danish Music Video of the Year in 2006. It also won Best Music Video at 2005 RESFEST, Los Angeles and a "Grand Prix" at the Festival International des Art du Clip in Provence.
 He was nominated for Robert Award (2006) in the category Best Special Effects/Lighting for Allegro.
 In 2008, he won the Robert Award for Best Animation for his short film Ung mand falder.
 At the 2008 Chicago International Children's Film Festival, his short film Vi der blev tilbage received the Children's Jury Award for a Live-Action Short Film or Video.
 In 2008, de Thurah's IKEA commercial "Home" won Best Direction at the Creative Circle Awards in Copenhagen and was awarded at the Hugo Television Awards in Chicago.
 At UK Music Video Awards 2009, de Thurah won the Best Director, Best Cinematography and Best Visual Effects awards for his video for Glasvegas’ "Flowers & Football Tops", and Best Pop Video award for Will Young’s "Changes". He was also nominated in several other categories.
 The music video for the single "When I Grow Up" by Fever Ray, as well as  videos for two Mew singles, "Introducing Palace Players" and "Repeaterbeater", were nominated at 2010 Bergen International Film Festival in the Scandinavias Best Music Video category.
 At UK Music Video Awards 2012, the music video for Feist's "The Bad In Each Other" won Best Cinematography in A Video.

Filmography

Director

Short films

Documentaries
 På danske læber live (2004) - music documentary

Music videos

Other filmography

References

External links

Martin de Thurah on IMVDb

1974 births
Living people
Danish storyboard artists
Danish male screenwriters
Danish cinematographers
Film directors from Copenhagen
Advertising directors